"I Go Crazy" is a song by British alternative rock band Flesh for Lulu from their third studio album Long Live the New Flesh (1987). An American college rock radio hit, the song gained prominence through its inclusion on the soundtrack to the 1987 film Some Kind of Wonderful.

Music video

The official music video for the song was directed by Andy Morahan.

References

1987 songs
1987 singles
Beggars Banquet Records singles
British alternative rock songs
British new wave songs
Flesh for Lulu songs
Music videos directed by Andy Morahan